Taras Kabanov (born 23 January 1981) is a former Ukrainian footballer who played as a forward.

Club career
In his career, he began with Volyn Lutsk and then transferred to Karpaty Lviv. Later he was given a free transfer to Kryvbas Kryvyi Rih. He also spent time with Metalurh Zaporizhzhia and the 2008–09 season with FC Kharkiv. In 2011, he played for PFC Oleksandria.

International career
In 2001 Kabanov represented Ukraine at the 2001 FIFA World Youth Championship. In 2004 he played his only match for the senior national team – a friendly against Lithuania.

References

External links
 

1981 births
Living people
Footballers from Lutsk
Ukrainian footballers
Ukraine international footballers
Ukraine under-21 international footballers
Ukraine youth international footballers
Ukrainian Premier League players
Ukrainian expatriate footballers
Expatriate footballers in Belarus
Ukrainian expatriate sportspeople in Belarus
FC Karpaty Lviv players
FC Karpaty-2 Lviv players
FC Metalurh Zaporizhzhia players
FC Kharkiv players
FC Volyn Lutsk players
FC Lviv players
FC Oleksandriya players
FC Belshina Bobruisk players
FC Nyva Ternopil players
Association football forwards
Sportspeople from Volyn Oblast